Nomafrench Mbombo (born 6 September 1966) is a South African academic and politician who has been the Western Cape Provincial Minister of Health since 2015 and a Member of the Western Cape Provincial Parliament since 2014. She previously served as the Western Cape Provincial Minister of Cultural Affairs and Sport from 2014 to 2015. Mbombo was the Federal Leader of the Democratic Alliance Women's Network from 2018 to 2021.

Early life and education
Mbombo was born on 6 September 1966. She spent her childhood in Mdantsane, East London in the former Cape Province.

She earned a PhD in the fields of Gender and Human Rights from the University of the Western Cape. Mbombo achieved her Masters in Maternal and Child Health from the University of KwaZulu-Natal, and her Bachelors in Nursing Science from the University of Fort Hare. She was then employed in the Eastern Cape and KwaZulu-Natal provincial and local government health departments.

Before being involved in politics, she worked as an associate professor at the Faculty of Community and Health Sciences Department of the University of the Western Cape.

She has also served as a member of various organisations, such as the National Committee of Confidential Enquiries on Maternal Death, NEPAD, and the UN Office of Human Rights: Women & Gender Directorate.

Political career
Mbombo, previously an African National Congress supporter, joined the DA in 2013, after attending a DA meeting for black professionals.

Mbombo was elected to the Western Cape Provincial Parliament in the 8 May 2014 election and was sworn in as a Member on 21 May 2014. She represents the Philippi region of the City of Cape Town. Premier Helen Zille appointed Mbombo to the post of Western Cape Provincial Minister of Cultural Affairs and Sport. She was sworn in as Provincial Minister on 26 May 2014.

In December 2014, Premier Zille announced that Theuns Botha and Mbombo would exchange ministerial positions. Mbombo would become Western Cape Provincial Minister of Health, while Botha would take her position. The changes came into effect on 1 January 2015.

In 2018, incumbent Democratic Alliance Women's Network Federal Leader Denise Robinson announced that she would not seek re-election to another term. Mbombo subsequently declared her candidacy and was elected at the party's Federal Congress on 7 April 2018.

In May 2019, newly elected premier Alan Winde announced that he had retained Mbombo in her post as Provincial Minister of Health.

In October 2019, she declared her candidacy for interim Federal Chairperson of the Democratic Alliance following Athol Trollip's resignation. She lost to Ivan Meyer.

In December 2020, Mbombo was criticised for posting on Facebook that she was on holiday in Limpopo, amid the second wave of COVID-19 infections in the Western Cape. She said that it was a "well-deserved, long overdue break".

On 28 April 2021, Mbombo resigned as the Federal Leader of the DA's Women's Network. Her resignation came after Bonginkosi Madikizela resigned as DA provincial leader and the Provincial Minister of Transport and Public Works.

Personal life
Mbombo was married and has two daughters. Her husband died in 2003.

In March 2020, Mbombo came into contact with the French consul-general Laurent Amar who tested positive for COVID-19. She consequently went into self-isolation and later tested negative.

References

|-

|-

Living people
Democratic Alliance (South Africa) politicians
Members of the Western Cape Provincial Parliament
Xhosa people
Women members of provincial legislatures of South Africa
21st-century South African women politicians
21st-century South African politicians
1966 births